Khushal Garh railway station
() is  located in  Pakistan.

See also
 List of railway stations in Pakistan
 Pakistan Railways

References

External links

Railway stations in Kohat District
Railway stations on Khushalgarh–Kohat–Thal Railway